Helcystogramma ceriochrantum is a moth in the family Gelechiidae. It is found in Sichuan, China.

Taxonomy
Helcystogramma ceriochrantum was synonymized with Helcystogramma trijunctum on the basis of collected specimens of these species in the same place and time, and without other comments. It was later reinstated as a valid species.

References

Moths described in 1939
ceriochrantum
Moths of Asia